Maureen Anderman (born October 26, 1946) is an American actress best known for her work on the stage. She has appeared in eighteen Broadway shows over the last four decades earning several Drama Desk Award and Tony Award nominations.

Career
Anderman made her Broadway debut as Bianca in the 1970 revival of Othello. Two years later she won a Theater World Award for her portrayal of Ruth in Moonchildren. In 1975 she was nominated for a Drama Desk Award for her performance of Sarah in Edward Albee's Seascape. Her other Broadway credits during the 1970s include
An Evening With Richard Nixon and... (1972), The Last of Mrs. Lincoln  (1973), Hamlet (1975), Who's Afraid of Virginia Woolf? (1976), and A History of the American Film (1978). Anderman also began working in television during the 1970s, appearing in guest roles on television series such as Kojak (1976) and The Andros Targets (1977), as well as numerous TV movies.

In 1980, Anderman was nominated for a Tony Award for her portrayal of Carol in The Lady from Dubuque. She remained active on Broadway throughout the 1980s appearing in The Man Who Came to Dinner (1980), Macbeth (1981), Einstein and the Polar Bear (1981), You Can't Take It with You (1983–1984), Benefactors (1985–1986), and Social Security (1987). She also remained active in television appearing on several programs, including Another World, Search for Tomorrow (where she played evil manager, Sylvie DesCartes), St. Elsewhere, The Days and Nights of Molly Dodd, and The Equalizer. She also starred in the 1983 film adaptation of Erich Segal's Man, Woman and Child.

Anderman's career slowed down during the 1990s as she chose to focus on her family. She did, however, appear in episodes of One Life to Live (as Nora Hanen's psychiatrist sister, Susannah Hanen, 1995), Law & Order and Homicide: Life on the Street (in the crossover episode, "Baby, It's You," as the evil Gayle Janaway, 1997), and Law & Order: Criminal Intent (2003). She also appeared in the film Final (2001).

In 2007, Anderman returned to Broadway as the cover artist for Vanessa Redgrave in The Year of Magical Thinking.

Throughout her career Anderman has been active in Off-Broadway and regional theater productions. Off Broadway she appeared in Passion Play, A.R. Gurney's Later Life and Ancestral Voices, and Kenneth Lonergan's The Waverly Gallery among others. Her regional credits include Third, Rabbit Hole and The Sisters Rosensweig (Huntington Theatre), The Waverly Gallery (Williamstown Theatre Festival); First Lady (Yale Repertory Theatre); Listening, Moon for the Misbegotten, Tartuffe (Hartford Stage), Booth is Back and Betrayal (Long Wharf Theatre), and Noël Coward in Two Keys (Berkshire Theatre Festival) among many others.

Personal life 
Anderman is married to actor Frank Converse.

Filmography

Film

Television

References

External links
 
 
 
 
 

American stage actresses
American television actresses
Theatre World Award winners
1946 births
Living people
Actresses from Detroit
American film actresses